Milanofiori Nord is a station on Line 2 of the Milan Metro, in the southern suburb of Assago. The line here runs beside Autostrada A7. The station was opened on 20 February 2011 as part of an extension from Famagosta to Assago Milanofiori Forum.

References

Line 2 (Milan Metro) stations
Railway stations opened in 2011
2011 establishments in Italy
Railway stations in Italy opened in the 21st century